The red handfish (Thymichthys politus, formerly Brachionichthys politus) is a species of handfish in the genus Thymichthys, found in Frederick Henry Bay, Tasmania.

Description
The red handfish is distinguished by its small, flattened wart-like protuberances that cover its body and red colouration. Two colour morphs exist, a bright red morph with red colour on both body and fins, with a black line separating the white fin edges and a mottled morph with pink body covered in many red patches, with translucent pink fins expressing some bright red patches. They measure an average standard length of 61.4 mm (2.4 in) and an average total length of 80.1 mm (3.2 in). Like other handfishes, they have large developed pectoral fins, which they use to walk along the sea floor.

Distribution
Historically, the species was found in multiple subpopulations in Tasmania, including Port Arthur, Fortescue Bay, the Actaeon Islands, D'Entrecasteaux Channel, and the Forestier Peninsula. Currently, the species has been found only on 2 small reefs in Frederick Henry Bay. These species typically reside in reef sand junctions, where there is an abundance of sand and rocks. These reefs measure a circular area of no more than 75 meters and 50 meters in diameter. It is found at depth ranges from 1 m up to 20 m.

Threats and conservation
General threats to red handfish include small, very fragmented populations and local increases in density of native purple urchins. Native purple urchins overgraze the seaweed habitat required for shelter and spawning for the red handfish. Summer observations of low seaweed on urchin barrens suggest that loss of seaweed habitat might represent a key threat to long term viability of the population In addition, the close vicinity of urban development increases the risk of nutrient runoff, pollution, siltation, and turbidity. This results in habitat degradation through the ruin of the red handfish's preferred seaweed habitat.

The red handfish is classed as Critically Endangered under the Australian Environment Protection and Biodiversity Conservation Act 1999 (EPBC Act) and by the IUCN, and as Endangered under Tasmania's Threatened Species Protection Act 1995.

Red handfish may face severe pressure due to direct environmental consequences of warming coastal waters, including potential implications on reproduction, egg development, feeding, and escape reaction, which are currently unknown.

Footnotes

References 

 Graham J. Edgar. (2017). New opportunities for conservation of handfishes (Family Brachionichthyidae) and other inconspicuous and threatened marine species through citizen science. ScienceDirect. 174-182. .

 Jemima, Smith. (2020). Conservation challenges for the most threatened family of marine bony fishes (handfishes: Brachionichthyidae). ScienceDirect. 

 Lynch, Tim. (2015). Diver towed GPS to estimate densities of a critically endangered fish. ScienceDirect.  

These sources are from the science citation index. Specifically, they were found through the University of Illinois at Chicago database.

red handfish
Endemic fauna of Tasmania
Marine fish of Tasmania
red handfish